These are the Billboard magazine Hot Dance Airplay number one hits of 2011.

Note that Billboard publishes charts with an issue date approximately 7–10 days in advance.

See also
2011 in music
List of number-one dance singles of 2011 (U.S.)

References

2011
United States Dance Airplay
Number-one dance airplay hits